Myron Lee Coulter, Ed.D. (March 21, 1929October 4, 2011)  was an American university professor, administrator, and president/chancellor. From 1968 to 1976, Coulter served as Associate Dean/Professor of Education, Vice President for Institutional Services, Vice President for Administration, and Interim President at Western Michigan University in Kalamazoo. He was appointed President of Idaho State University in Pocatello from 1976 to 1984. In 1984, Coulter became 16th Chancellor of Western Carolina University in Cullowhee, North Carolina, and served in that role until his retirement from higher education in 1994.

Known to friends and colleagues by his nickname of "Barney," Coulter guided Western Carolina University for a decade characterized by a renewed emphasis on excellence in teaching; service to the Western North Carolina region, developing cooperative international education partnerships, and close collaborations with the Eastern Band of Cherokee Indians.

During his tenure as WCU Chancellor, the university established the Faculty Center for Teaching Excellence, later renamed the Coulter Faculty Commons for Excellence in Teaching and Learning in recognition of his support of the center's efforts both as chancellor and, upon his retirement, as Chancellor Emeritus and Distinguished University Professor. Upon his retirement, WCU's Music and English Building was permanently renamed the Coulter Building, housing the university's School of Music, English Department, and Music Recital Hall.

As part of his emphasis on global outreach, Coulter led delegations to The Netherlands to establish a partnership in business education with Hogeschool West Brabant, to China to set up agreements for educational and cultural exchange with Yunnan University, and to Thailand, Swaziland and Jamaica to create and strengthen agreements for vocational, technical and teacher training.

An active community leader, Coulter served on the Board of Directors of Western North Carolina Tomorrow, the N.C. Center for the Advancement of Teaching, N.C. Board of Science and Technology, Western North Carolina Development Association, Center for PVO/University Collaboration in Development, C. J. Harris Community Hospital, Asheville Area Chamber of Commerce, WCQS Public Radio, Jackson County Chamber of Commerce and the N.C. Arboretum. He was a founding member of Friends of Great Smoky Mountains National Park, Cherokee Historical Association and the Community Foundation of Western North Carolina. Coulter was appointed by Governor James Hunt and renewed by Governor Mike Easley as the Founding Chair of the NC Certification Commission, where he served for twelve years; also served as co-chair for the NC Education Lottery Oversight Committee, where he served for five years by appointment by NC Speaker of the House Joe Hackney; and served as a member for several years on the board of Givens Estates in Asheville and the Lake Junaluska Visioning Committee.

He served as chairman of the board of directors for the American Association of State Colleges and Universities (AASCU) in 1988-89 and was a founding member of the Board of Directors of the Cherokee Preservation Foundation. Among his other professional appointments were the Commission for a Competitive North Carolina, Inter-American University Council for Economics and Social Development, and Governor's Task Force on Aquaculture.

Coulter came to WCU from Idaho State University, where he was president from 1976 to 1984. He previously served Western Michigan University in a number of administrative positions, including Vice President for Administration from 1974 to 1976; Interim President in 1974; Vice President for Institutional Services from 1968 to 1974; and Associate Dean and Professor of Education for the university's College of Education from 1966 to 1968.

He previously was associate professor of education at The Pennsylvania State University from 1964 to 1966, Director of Penn State's Latin American Education Project from 1962 to 1963; and instructor of education at Indiana University from 1958 to 1959. He also was an elementary school teacher in the Bloomington, Ind., Metropolitan Schools from 1954 to 1956, and an English teacher and athletics coach at Reading, Mich., Community High School from 1951 to 1952. He served in the U.S. Army as a Staff Sergeant during the Korean War from 1952 to 1954.

Born in Albany, Indiana and son to Mark and Violet Coulter, he was a first-generation college student earning a master's degree in Elementary Education in 1956 and Doctorate in Education in 1959, both from Indiana University. He received his bachelor's degree in 1951 from Indiana State University, where he majored in English, Physical Education and Science in Secondary Education. Coulter received an honorary Doctorate of Humane Letters in 1982 from the College of Idaho.

Coulter and Barbara Helen Bolinger of Dunkirk, Indiana, were married on July 21, 1951, celebrating 60 years of mutual admiration, and loving support. They had twin children, Nan and Ben, who both have careers in higher education.

References

External links
Idaho State University - Myron Coulter
 

Presidents of Idaho State University
Western Michigan University faculty
2011 deaths
1929 births
Chancellors of Western Carolina University